Cross country running shoes are made for cross country running, a form of long distance running. Season-specific trainers are available for different types of training.

Cross Country running 

Cross Country races vary in length and terrain. They are most often run at 5K, 6000 meters, 8000 meters, 10K, and 12,000 meters, though many races for children are shorter. During training season, professional runners can run anywhere from 40 to 120 miles each week, depending on preference, training method, and ability to remain healthy. While the impacts of differences among types of footwear may be minimal on a single run, the cumulative effect on performance and health can provide a competitive edge. Races are held on surfaces including gravel, grass, dirt or mud, sand, and asphalt (though racing on asphalt is not normally recommended).

Shoe types 

When training, trainers with support and cushioning are recommended as unsupportive, shoes without cushion can potentially cause repetitive stress injuries if used over a long period of time. For speed workouts, often held on tracks, lighter shoes with less cushioning and support may be used.

Racing shoes are lighter (around 5 ounces) and have 4-6 spikes or "pins", which help with traction on hills and wet terrain. They have less cushion than trainers, are less supportive, and often utilize a springy spike plate made of rubber or Pebax. In more recent shoe technology development, a carbon plate has been incorporated into the design of spikes.

Comparisons 

Cross country spikes are more robust than track spikes. They must deal with the elements more and with natural objects, like sticks and rocks. The upper is thicker, therefore, and can be water-proof. They often have more cushioning and heel support because of the stress of downhill running. In addition, they can have longer spikes (anywhere from 1/4 in. to 5/8 in.) for better traction, as they are used on natural terrain that are affected by weather and can include hills.

Fitting 

Specialist shops offer advanced fitting services. The feet change shape and swell when running, so a shoe that fit while sitting or walking may not work for running.

Preparing new shoes 

When wearing new shoes for the first time, it is crucial to make sure they are “broken in” by wearing them in undemanding situations, (walking, slow running) to lessen the chance for injury.

Potential injuries 

Common running injuries include blisters, twisted ankles, knee injuries and shin splints.

References 

Shoes
Athletic shoes
Cross country running